"Don't Sleep in the Subway" is a song written by Tony Hatch and Jackie Trent and recorded by British singer Petula Clark, for whom it was an April 1967 single release.

It received a 1968 Grammy award nomination for best contemporary song, losing to "Up, Up and Away" by The 5th Dimension.

Background
The song was constructed from three different sections of music previously composed by Hatch; it changes in musical style from pop to symphonic and then, for the chorus, to a Beach Boys-like melody.

In the lyrics the narrator advises her sweetheart against storming out after an argument due to his "foolish pride". If he does, he will "sleep in the subway" or "stand in the pouring rain" merely to prove his point. Although in Scotland there has long existed the Glasgow Subway metro line, in England the term "subway" refers to a pedestrian underpass rather than to an underground transit system. Hatch employed the term in the North American sense. According to the song's co-writer Jackie Trent the title lyric was suggested by the 1961–62 Broadway musical Subways Are for Sleeping.

'Don't Sleep in the Subway' peaked at #5 on the US charts in July 1967, becoming Clark's final US Top Ten single and was also, for three consecutive weeks,  the second of her two #1 hits on the Billboard Easy Listening chart, following the 1966 release of 'I Couldn't Live Without Your Love'.

In the UK where her precedent single 'This Is My Song' had afforded Clark her best chart showing with two weeks at #1 'Don't Sleep in the Subway' had a July 1967 chart peak of #12, evincing a decline in Clark's UK chart profile which would continue until Clark made her last UK Top 40 appearance with a new recording, 'Song of My Life' which peaked at #32 in March 1971. (Clark would subsequently peak at #47 UK with 'I Don't Know How to Love Him' in 1972 and in 1988 a remix of her 1964 recording 'Downtown' would peak at #10 UK.) 'Don't Sleep in the Subway' reached #3 in Rhodesia, #5 in Canada, #7 in New Zealand, #10 in South Africa and #16 in Germany. In Australia, it was at #1 on the charts dated 16 and 23 September 1967, marking Clark's final appearance at #1 on an official national chart.

Cited by Clark—with "I Couldn't Live Without Your Love"—as her favourite of her hits, "Don't Sleep in the Subway" has also been recorded by Betty Chung, Rita Hovink, Marilyn Maye, Matt Monro, Patti Page, Frank Sinatra, Caterina Valente, and Mari Wilson. A Spanish rendering, "No duermas en el metro", was recorded by both Gelu (es) and Los Stop (es). Siw Malmkvist recorded the Swedish rendering "Sov inte på tunnelbanan" (Swedish lyrics by Peter Himmelstrand) in 1970.

The song's title was used as part of a candidate's name in "Election Night Special", a sketch on Monty Python's Flying Circus: another of that series' episodes featured  Cardinal Richelieu (Michael Palin) lip-synching to Clark's record on the show-within-a-show Historical Impersonations. It also makes a brief appearance in the Malcolm in the Middle episode "Emancipation"—Lois blasts the song on her car stereo to avoid confronting Francis about his legal emancipation.

The song was performed by Rachel Berry (Lea Michele) and Artie Abrams (Kevin McHale)  in the 2014 Glee episode "New New York".

Charts

See also
List of number-one adult contemporary singles of 1967 (U.S.)

References

Petula Clark songs
Caterina Valente songs
1967 singles
Songs written by Tony Hatch
Number-one singles in Australia
Songs written by Jackie Trent
Song recordings produced by Tony Hatch
1967 songs
Pye Records singles
Warner Records singles
Disques Vogue singles